Phanerothyme is the ninth full-length studio album by the Norwegian band Motorpsycho. It was released through Stickman Records (Europe) and Sony (Norway). It was also released in Japan through P-Vine.

Track listing
"Bedroom Eyes" – 2:18
"For Free" – 5:13
"B.S." – 3:41
"Landslide" – 4:38
"Go To California" – 8:00
"Painting The Night Unreal" – 6:35
"The Slow Phaseout" – 4:30
"Blindfolded" – 3:44
"When You're Dead" – 4:52

 Nr. 1–3, 6 by Sæther.
 Nr. 4, 5, 7 by Sæther/Ryan.
 Nr. 8 by Ryan.
 Nr. 9 by Gebhardt.

Vinyl version
Due to space limitations, the track list was altered for the LP release.

Side A 
Bedroom Eyes
For Free
B.S.
Landslide
The Slow Phaseout

Side B 
Go To California
Painting the Night Unreal
Blindfolded
When You're Dead

Personnel
Bent Sæther: vocals, bass, guitars, mellotron, guitarmando, percussion, viscount organ, drums
Hans Magnus Ryan: guitars, vocals, piano, viscount organ, mellotron, bass
Håkon Gebhardt: drums, vocals, percussion, guitars, zither, banjo, lap-steel guitar
Helge Sten (Deathprod): audio virus, filters, ringmodulators, echoplex, theremin
Baard Slagsvold: piano, Wurlitzer, clavinette, Rhodes piano, backing vocals. Slagsvold did all the string/reed-arrangements, except for "When You're Dead," which was arranged by Lars Horntveth.
Øyvind Fossheim: violin
Vegard Johnsen: violin
André Orvik: violin
Hans Morten Stensland: violin
Jon W. Sønstebø: viola
Anne Britt Søvig Årdal: cello
Ketil Vestrum Einarsen: flute
Lars Horntveth: tenor sax and bass-clarinet
Anne-Grethe Orvik: oboe
Even Skatrud Andersen: trombone
Mathias Eick: trumpet and flugelhorn
Line Horntveth: tuba
Kim Hiorthøy: cover artwork

Videos
The band made videos for "The Slow Phaseout" and "Go To California", the latter showing them as Amish people walking, running and jumping through the Norwegian woods, whilst carrying surfboards around.

Singles
There were no single/EP releases for this album, but some of the additional songs recorded during the Phanerothyme sessions surfaced on the "Serpentine" EP (2002). Also an EP named "Barracuda" was released in February 2001, containing left over songs from the Let Them Eat Cake-sessions. Still, promotional only singles of "The Slow Phaseout" and "Go To California" (edited version, 2:53 mins) were pressed and sent to radio stations.

2001 albums
Motorpsycho albums